is a Japanese yaoi manga known for its melodramatic, almost operatic plot, its "semi-insane characters", and for the controversial style of its artwork. The word "Zetsu-ai" is a compound created by Minami Ozaki which has been translated as "desperate love". Ozaki's preferred English translation is "Everlasting Love". Many western yaoi fans got their introduction to the genre through this series, which defined the genre for them.

Synopsis
-from Minami Ozaki's "Legend of the Holy Beast

Kōji Nanjō is one of the most successful rock stars in Japan, with his hauntingly beautiful voice and very attractive features. But beneath all the fame and glamour, he is a damaged and hurt young man who has absolutely no happiness or interest in life.

One night after a string of bar-hopping, Kōji passes out in a heap of trash in the rain. He is found, taken in, and cared for by Takuto Izumi, a soccer prodigy. Despite the fact that Izumi is a complete stranger, he moves Kōji deeply, and Kōji soon develops an intense obsession with Izumi. It is later revealed that the reason Kōji sings is to find the person he fell in love with at first sight six years earlier, whom he remembers for showing extreme ferocity on the soccer field and for a particularly penetrating gaze. Kōji knows the person's name is 'Izumi,' but he thinks the person he saw was a girl, so initially he believes it was Serika Izumi, Takuto's sister.  It is only when Takuto looks at him angrily that he realizes Takuto is the 'Izumi' he was looking for. His body goes into shock, and from then on his obsession with Izumi knows no bounds.

As Kōji forces himself more and more into Izumi's life, he exposes Izumi and his loved ones to his dangerous lifestyle and extremely dysfunctional family. When Takuto's little brother asks Kōji if he is gay, Kōji replies, 'No, I am not gay. I am only in love with Takuto.  Even if you were twins, I could only love Takuto.' At times, the hurdles the relationship faces become too difficult to bear. In the midst of it, Kōji temporarily loses his voice and is forced to go back to his brother and family.

Due to the manga artist's illness, the manga ended at volume 19 without a proper ending. When she recovered, she drew the dojinshi , to give readers a proper 'final meeting' scene.

Characters

 Young Takuto Izumi 
 Adult Takuto Izumi

Publications
While the series has been published in several languages, it has not been published in English.

It first originated as a spin-off of the author's Captain Tsubasa doujinshi Dokusen Yoku. The pairing of Kōjirō Hyūga and Ken Wakashimazu, featured in Dokusen Yoku, is immensely popular and has been compared to the classic slash fiction pairing of Kirk/Spock. The usual dynamic in Kōjirō/Ken doujinshi is that their relationship is based on trust. Kōjirō is the man of the family due to his father's death. Ken on the other hand, is heir to a martial arts school, and is constantly under pressure to quit soccer, and suffers an injury from trying to be the best in both fields. The boys support each other and eventually their deep friendship becomes love. The original Zetsuai was abandoned after 5 volumes. Minami Ozaki later picked the story back up in 1992 with Bronze. Since then, Bronze has outpaced the original Zetsuai with 14 volumes, with the current story arc called "Restart".

Two OVAs were made, one taking place in Zetsuai [Since] 1989, and the second during Bronze: Zetsuai since 1989 (also called Bronze Zetsuai or simply Bronze).  Koyasu Takehito plays the part of Izumi Takuto, and Sho Hayami plays Koji Nanjo.  Radio dramas and CDs (with some lyrics composed by Minami Ozaki) were produced.  The actors themselves often provided vocal parts for music.  Five original music videos were made and compiled into a video called Cathexis.

As of 2003, fan translations of the first eleven volumes of Zetsuai / Bronze were available.

Zetsuai 1989 was licensed in French (by Tonkam), German (Carlsen Verlag), Korean, Spanish (Glénat España) and Italian (Panini Comics) languages.

Zetsuai 1989 was the first shōnen-ai manga to be officially translated into German.

Manga volumes

Zetsuai 1989

Bronze: Zetsuai Since 1989

Soundtrack

Several albums were released relating to the Dokusen Yoku doujinshi, Zetsuai 1989 and Bronze since Zetsuai between 1988 and 1996.

Light novels
Several light novels were published by Shueisha. They were written by Akiyama Rin with illustrations by Minami Ozaki. The plot of novels is mostly connected to Nanjo family (Kaen Danshō series in particular), for example Kouji's elder brother Nanjo Hirose.

Reception

At the time of its writing, the genre as a whole was not commonly recognised by those not creating it, but Zetsuai 1989 is considered one of yaoi's "major works" and "one of the greatest icons of shōnen-ai". Koji and Izumi have been described as shōnen-ai'''s Romeo and Juliet.  There is little explicit sex in the series.  Instead, the series is "angst-ridden", and includes "a lot of blood" via themes of self-harm and accidents. Ozaki's works have been described as "prolonged erotic psychodramas", and Zetsuai 1989 is the "most famous" of these.

The depiction of love in the series has been described as "nearly violent", which is regarded as a "true revelation" for female readers. The character of Izumi's mother has been criticised by Kazuko Suzuki as an example of yaoi showing "extremely negative images of mothers". Anime News Network has criticised the melodramatic tone of the OVA Bronze: Zetsuai Since 1989. described the art style of Zetsuai as being "like a fashion designer's workbook", but Anime News Network says that the character design is "horribly mutated" and "disgusting". Matt Thorn describes the relationship between Koji Nanjo and Takuto Izumi as an "intense and often grim love story", saying that "if you like your shônen-ai (or "slash") intense, look no further."

References

Further reading
 
 
 Animerica'' April 1993 (vol. 1, no. 4)

External links
 Official Site
 

1992 anime OVAs
1994 anime OVAs
1989 manga
1992 manga
1997 Japanese novels
2011 manga
Drama anime and manga
Light novels
Production I.G
Shōjo manga
Shueisha franchises
Shueisha manga
Yaoi anime and manga